Phineas Jones Stone (May 23, 1810 – August 12, 1891) was a Massachusetts politician who served as a member of the Massachusetts House of Representatives as a member of the Board of Selectmen for the Town of Charlestown, Massachusetts, as a member of and president of the Common Council and as the seventh mayor of the City of Charlestown, Massachusetts.

Notes

References
 Bacon, Edwin Monroe: Boston of to-day: a glance at its history and characteristics. p. 411, (1892).
 City of Boston: A Catalogue of the City Councils of Boston, 1822-1908, Roxbury, 1846-1867, Charlestown 1847-1873 and of The Selectmen of Boston, 1634-1822 also of Various Other Town and Municipal officers, {1909}.
Davis, William Thomas: Professional and industrial history of Suffolk County, Massachusetts, Volume 2. pps. 551-553, (1894).

1810 births
1891 deaths
Massachusetts city council members
Members of the Massachusetts House of Representatives
Mayors of Charlestown, Massachusetts
19th-century American politicians
People from Weare, New Hampshire